The Battle of Pedroso was fought on 18 January 1071, in Pedroso, near Braga, Portugal.

Forces under García II, the King of Galicia, defeated those under Nuno II Mendes, the last count of Portugal of the House of Vímara Peres.  Nuno Mendes died in the battle, and Garcia II declared himself King of Portugal, the first to do so.

Notes

References
António Brandão, Bernardo de Brito, Crónica do conde D. Henrique, D. Teresa e infante D. Afonso (1944).
Ângelo Ribeiro, História de Portugal: A formação do território - da Lusitânia ao alargamento do país (2004) 

County of Portugal
Pedroso
1071 in Europe
11th century in Portugal